The Maryland Terrapins football team represents the University of Maryland in the National Collegiate Athletic Association (NCAA) Division I Football Bowl Subdivision (FBS). In its 130 active years, the team has played in over a thousand games, including 28 post-season bowl game appearances. The Terrapins have been awarded 2 national championships, 11 conference champions, and 17 times received a final ranking in the Associated Press (AP) Poll. Maryland is the only Atlantic Coast Conference (ACC) team to have twice secured three consecutive outright conference championships. Many Maryland alumni have continued their playing careers in professional football, including Randy White, Boomer Esiason, Shawne Merriman, Dick Modzelewski, and Stan Jones.

The modern Maryland Terrapins football program traces its beginning to the team first formed by quarterback Will Skinner in 1892 at what was then known as the Maryland Agricultural College. Since then, the Terrapins (commonly known as the "Terps") have experienced their most success under head coaches Jim Tatum, Jerry Claiborne, Bobby Ross, and Ralph Friedgen.

Between 1947 and 1955, Jim Tatum led the Terps to two national championships, two ACC championships, a Southern Conference championship, and five bowl game appearances. In 1952, Maryland quarterback Jack Scarbath was the runner-up to the Heisman Trophy, which is awarded to college football's most outstanding player. The next year, coach Tatum led the team through an undefeated regular season. This resulted in Maryland being awarded the 1953 National Championship.

During Jerry Claiborne's tenure, from 1972 to 1981, the team captured three consecutive ACC championships and made seven bowl game appearances, the most of any Maryland coach to date. In Bobby Ross's five years at Maryland, from 1982 to 1986, he led the team to three consecutive ACC championships and four bowl appearances. In 1984, quarterback Frank Reich led the team to victory from a 31–0 halftime deficit against Miami in what was then the greatest comeback in NCAA football history. This period was marked by bitter competition for ACC primacy with 1981 national champions Clemson, and between 1974 and 1988, each team won six conference championships.

In 1986, when Maryland basketball star Len Bias suffered a drug overdose, it sent a ripple-effect through the athletic department. Bobby Ross said that he was offended by unfounded "innuendo, insinuation and guilt by association" aimed at the football team and resigned as head coach. In the following fourteen years, Maryland had two winning seasons and appeared in one bowl game.

In 2001, Ralph Friedgen took over a Maryland team that had one winning season in the past decade, and led them to an ACC championship and a Bowl Championship Series (BCS) game in his first season. In the following two years, Friedgen became the only ACC head coach to have led his team to win ten games in each of his first three seasons. In his ten-year tenure, Friedgen led the Terrapins to seven bowl appearances. In his last year, Maryland concluded the 2010 season with a 9-4 record, a win in the Military Bowl, and a top 25 national ranking.

Seasons

Notes

References

Lists of college football seasons
Maryland Terrapins football seasons